I Was a Teenage Werewolf is a 1957 horror film starring Michael Landon as a troubled teenager, Yvonne Lime and Whit Bissell. It was co-written and produced by cult film producer Herman Cohen and was one of the most successful films released by American International Pictures (AIP).

It was originally released as a double feature with Invasion of the Saucer Men. The release included the tagline, "We DARE You To See The Most Amazing Motion Pictures Of Our Time!"

Plot 
Tony Rivers, a troubled teenager at Rockdale High, has a short and explosive temper which gets him into numerous fights. Local police Detective Donovan advises Tony to talk with a psychologist that works at the local aircraft plant, Dr. Alfred Brandon, a practitioner of hypnotherapy. Tony declines, but his girlfriend Arlene, as well as his widowed father Charles, show concern about his violent behavior. At a Halloween party at the "haunted house", an old house at which teenagers hang out, Tony attacks his friend Vic after being surprised from behind. After seeing the shocked expressions on his friends' faces, he realizes he needs help and goes to see Dr. Brandon.

Brandon concludes Tony's troubled history makes him an excellent subject for his experiments with a scopolamine serum he has developed that regresses personalities to their primitive instincts. Brandon believes that the only future that mankind has is to "hurl him back to his primitive state." Although Brandon's assistant, Dr. Hugo Wagner, protests that the experiment might kill Tony, Brandon injects Tony with the serum, telling Tony it is a sedative to prepare him for hypnosis. During a series of hypnosis sessions, Brandon draws out Tony's traumatic childhood memories and suggests to Tony that he was once a wild animal.

After a small party at the haunted house, Tony drives Arlene home. One of their buddies, Frank, is attacked and killed as he is walking home through the woods. Donovan and Police Chief Baker review photographs of the victim and notice the fatal wounds look like fang marks, but there are no wild animals in the area. Pepi, the police station's janitor, persuades officer Chris Stanley to let him see the photos. Pepi, a native of the Carpathian Mountains, where werewolves, "human beings possessed by wolves", are common, recognizes the marks on Frank's body. Chris, however, dismisses the idea of a werewolf.

After another session with Brandon, during which Tony tells the doctor that he feels that there is something very wrong with him, Tony reports to Miss Ferguson, the principal of Rockdale High. Miss Ferguson tells Tony that Brandon has given him a positive report regarding his behavior, and that she intends to recommend Tony for entry into State College. As Tony leaves the school, he passes the gymnasium where a woman, Theresa is practicing by herself. A school bell behind his head rings, triggering his transformation into a werewolf, and he attacks and kills Theresa. Tony flees the high school and witnesses identify him by his clothing. Baker issues an all-points bulletin for his arrest.

Donovan confronts Brandon, pointing out that his recent sessions with Tony are the most obvious possible cause for Tony's transformation into a werewolf, but Brandon persists in pleading innocence. A local reporter, Doyle, interviews Charles, as well as Arlene and her parents, in the hope of locating Tony and getting a scoop. Baker and Donovan attempt to trap Tony in the woods where they think he may be hiding. Still in the form of a werewolf, Tony watches as the dragnet looks for him, but is attacked by a dog and kills it.

In the morning, Tony reverts to his normal appearance and walks into the town. He phones Arlene but hangs up without saying anything, giving police too little time to trace the call. Tony heads to Brandon's office and begs for his help. Brandon wants to capture Tony's transformation on film in order to prove his procedure works. Brandon tells Tony he will help him and injects him with the serum again. Following the transformation, a nearby ringing telephone triggers Tony's instincts and he kills both Brandon and Wagner, breaking open the camera in the process, ruining the film. Alerted that Tony has been seen nearby, Donovan and Chris break in and shoot several times as Tony advances toward them. Upon dying, Tony's normal features return, leaving Donovan to speculate on Brandon's involvement and on the mistake of man interfering in the realms of God.

Production notes
Samuel Z. Arkoff wrote in his memoirs that he got a lot of resistance for producing a film portraying a teenager becoming a monster, an idea that had never been exploited in film before.

Dawn Richard, who plays a teenaged gymnast in the film, was a 21-year-old Playboy centerfold model at the time, appearing in the magazine's May 1957 issue, which hit the newsstands a month ahead of the movie.

Pepe, the Romanian janitor at the police station, was played by the Russian-born Vladimir Sokoloff, a character actor who appeared as ethnic types in over 100 productions, his most famous being the old Mexican man in The Magnificent Seven three years later.

Tony Marshall is the only other male actor to receive billing in the trailer for I Was a Teenage Werewolf, in addition to Landon and Bissell; however, he made only one other motion picture, the obscure Rockabilly Baby, for Twentieth Century-Fox, which was released in October of the same year.

Shooting began 13 February 1957. The movie was shot in seven days.

This film was the first of four "teenage monster" movies produced by AIP during 1957 and 1958. All four films highlighting a theme of innocent teenagers being preyed upon, transformed, and used by corrupt adults for selfish interests. I Was a Teenage Frankenstein and Blood of Dracula were both released in November 1957 and feature a teenage boy transformed into a Frankenstein's monster and a teenage girl transformed into a werewolf-like vampire, respectively. How to Make a Monster, released in 1958, features two young actors being hypnotized to kill while in make-up as the monster characters "Teenage Werewolf" and "Teenage Frankenstein" of the 1957 films.

Cast
 Michael Landon as Tony Rivers
 Yvonne Lime as Arlene Logan
 Whit Bissell as Dr. Alfred Brandon
 Malcolm Atterbury as Charles Rivers
 Barney Phillips as Detective Sgt. Donovan
 Robert Griffin as Police Chief Baker
 Joseph Mell as Dr. Hugo Wagner
 Louise Lewis as Principal Ferguson
 Guy Williams as Officer Chris Stanley
 Tony Marshall as Jimmy
 Vladimir Sokoloff as Pepe, the janitor
 Kenny Miller as Vic
 Cindy Robbins as Pearl
 Michael Rougas as Frank
 Dawn Richard as Theresa
 S. John Launer as Mr. Bill Logan
 Dorothy Crehan as Mrs. Mary Logan

Release and reception 
 
Variety reported: "Another in the cycle of regression themes is a combo teenager and science-fiction yarn which should do okay in the exploitation market [...] Only thing new about this Herman Cohen production is a psychiatrist's use of a problem teenager [...] but it's handled well enough to meet the requirements of this type film. [...] good performances help overcome deficiencies. Final reels, where the lad turns into a hairy-headed monster with drooling fangs, are inclined to be played too heavily." Variety went on to say that Landon delivers "a first-class characterization as the high school boy constantly in trouble." Harrison's Reports was fairly positive, writing, "This horror type program melodrama should give pretty good satisfaction in theatres where such films are acceptable. The story is, of course, fantastic, but it has been handled so expertly that it holds the spectator in tense suspense." The Monthly Film Bulletin in the UK was negative, declaring, "A piece of old-fashioned and second-rate horror, the transformations are very badly done, the scientific background is shaky in the extreme and the monster looks like anything but the usual idea of a werewolf. It all seems rather hard on poor Tony, who is quite a pleasant boy when he's himself."

According to Tim Dirks, the film was one of a wave of "cheap teen movies" released for the drive-in market. They consisted of "exploitative, cheap fare created especially for them [teens] in a newly-established teen/drive-in genre."

The film was very profitable, as it was made on a very low budget but grossed as much as US $2,000,000, compared to its $82,000 budget.
Released in June 1957, it was followed five months later by I Was a Teenage Frankenstein and Blood of Dracula and by the sequel How to Make a Monster in July 1958.

AIP's female "teenage vampire" companion piece

Less than four months after the release of I Was a Teenage Werewolf and coinciding with the release of I Was a Teenage Frankenstein, AIP released Blood of Dracula, a film which bears more than a passing resemblance to their summer box office hit. More or less a remake, and with the hero and villain roles now both played by females, Blood of Dracula, with a story and screenplay credit by I Was a Teenage Werewolf writer Ralph Thornton (a pseudonym for AIP producer Herman Cohen and Aben Kandel), features many other similarities to I Was a Teenage Werewolf: for instance, both have (among other things) a teenager with social behavior problems, an adult mad scientist who is searching for the perfect guinea pig under the guise of helping troubled youth, an observer who can tell the killings are the work of a monster, a disbelieving police chief afraid of the press, a song written by Jerry Blaine and Paul Dunlap accompanied by a choreographed "ad-lib" dance number, hypnosis as a scientific medical treatment, drug injections, specific references to Carpathia, hairy transformation scenes and even some of the same dialogue. In addition, two prominent actors from I Was a Teenage Werewolf are also featured in Blood of Dracula, Malcolm Atterbury and Louise Lewis, with Lewis' villain, 'Miss Branding' a practically perfect female version of Whit Bissel's 'Dr. Brandon'. However, few critics have drawn a connection between the two films and while most reference works consider I Was a Teenage Frankenstein and How to Make a Monster as direct follow-ups to I Was a Teenage Werewolf, not even critic Leonard Maltin speaks of Blood of Dracula as being related to the trilogy.

Legacy
I Was a Teenage Werewolf helped launch Landon's career, as he became a regular on Bonanza only two years later, staying for the entire TV show's run. Another actor from the film, Guy Williams, got into big roles for TV later into the 1960s: he first had the lead in the Disney TV Show Zorro, followed by playing Professor John Robinson on the TV show Lost in Space, which also featured other big name stars in regular and guest starring roles. During the Bonanza years, Williams and Landon did appearances together in some installments. Still another star from the film, Whit Bissell, got into sci-fi both on film and TV: he played numerous doctors (good and bad) and then played Gen. Kirk on the short-run TV series The Time Tunnel.

Although today the film is largely regarded as a source of "camp" humor, and while at the time of release the idea of an adult human turning into a beast was nothing new, the idea of a teenager doing just that in a movie was considered avant-garde—and even shocking—in 1957. I Was a Teenage Werewolf likely paved the way for Walt Disney to do his version of a Felix Salten shapeshifting novel, The Hound of Florence. Featuring Disney favorite Tommy Kirk as the hapless teenager, and A-lister Fred MacMurray as the answer to B-lister Whit Bissell, it was released in 1959 under the title The Shaggy Dog. The film betrays its successful forebear with Murray's classic bit of dialogue: "Don't be ridiculous — my son isn't any werewolf! He's just a big, baggy, stupid-looking, shaggy dog!"

Pop culture impact 
The film's Police Gazette-style title (which had already been used by Hollywood previously with pictures such as 1949's I Was a Male War Bride and 1951's I Was a Communist for the FBI) with the inclusion of the adjective "teenage" was used again by AIP for their sequel I Was a Teenage Frankenstein, and the original working title for their 1958 sci-fi film Attack of the Puppet People was I Was a Teenage Doll. Due to the success of I Was a Teenage Werewolf, this convention was constantly mocked in the late 1950s and early 1960s. Many sitcom television series in particular had characters going to movies titled I Was a Teenage Dinosaur, Monster, etc., and it was often referenced in monologues by comedians and bits by disc jockeys.  Examples include Stan Freberg's 1957 radio series, which featured a Madison-Avenue/horror-movie spoof titled "Gray Flannel Hat Full of Teenage Werewolves", and the 1959 Dobie Gillis novel I Was a Teenage Dwarf by Max Shulman.

Film

The script title for 1985's Just One of the Guys was I Was a Teenage Boy, a title that used a year later as an alternate for 1986's Willy/Milly. An alternate title for the 1995 hit Clueless was I Was a Teenage Teenager.

Scenes from I Was a Teenage Werewolf were included in the 1973 "fifties nostalgia" concert film Let the Good Times Roll, featuring Madison Square Garden performances from Chuck Berry and Bill Haley and the Comets.

Television
Episode 2.19 (1963) of The Dick Van Dyke Show was entitled "I Was a Teenage Head Writer".

Episode 1.18 (1967) of The Monkees was entitled "I Was a Teenage Monster".

The July 16, 1982 episode of SCTV ("Battle of the PBS Stars") featured a comedy skit of the movie called "I Was a Teenage Communist", mixing horror with the politics of red-baiting during the 1950s.

In 1987, the NBC-TV series Highway to Heaven featured "I Was a Middle-Aged Werewolf" (episode 4.5), written and directed by Michael Landon. Landon, as angel Jonathan Smith,  transforms himself into a werewolf, initially to scare off some teenage bullies. During the earlier scenes, Jonathan's buddy, Mark Gordon (Victor French) watches the original film, remarking: "You know, the guy in this movie reminds me a lot of you", adding, "when he's a regular guy, not when he's got fuzz all over his face."

In April 1997, the movie was mocked directly when it was featured in episode 809 of Mystery Science Theater 3000. The host segments, however, parody the film Alien.

The October 28, 1999 episode of SpongeBob SquarePants is titled "I Was a Teenage Gary" and features SpongeBob transforming into a snail after a hypodermic injection.

A Phineas and Ferb episode in 2010 was titled "I Was a Middle-Aged Robot". It involves Phineas' dad, Mr. Fletcher, having his imagination sucked away and the O.W.C.A. (Organization Without a Cool Acronym) replacing him with a robot controlled by Phineas & Ferb's pet platypus, Perry, also known as Agent P.

Music
Starting in 1975 and known as the first Horror Punk band, Sid Terror's Undead has given nods to this movie a couple times, on their self-titled first album SID TERROR'S UNDEAD (1978) with the song "I Was A Teenage Vampire" (words and music written by Sid Terror), and again with the song "Awkward" (words and music written by Sid Terror reference the I Was A Teenage Werewolf sequel, I Was A Teenage Frankenstein (1957)) as recently as 2020 on their album Pandemic Garage.   John Cooper Clarke's 1978 album, "Disguise in Love " features the song "Teenage Werewolf", the song goes on to feature in Clarke's 2015 album "Anthological". The Cramps, whose songs routinely reference horror and sci-fi films, have a song titled "I Was a Teenage Werewolf" on their 1980 album Songs the Lord Taught Us. Anarchist vegan punk band Propagandhi wrote a song titled "I Was a Pre-Teen McCarthyist" and is featured on the 1996 album Less Talk, More Rock. Rock band Queens of the Stone Age have a song on their 1998 self-titled debut album with the title, "I Was a Teenage Hand Model". Australian rock band Faker released a song in 2005 entitled "Teenage Werewolf."  Punk band Against Me! released a song in 2010 titled "I Was a Teenage Anarchist". Pop punk artist Lil Cam'Ron's debut album I Was a Teenage Cameron also references the title. American Musical Theater Composer Joe Iconis wrote a song titled . Brazilian rock band Legião Urbana has a song called "Eu Era Um Lobisomem Juvenil", title of the movie in Portuguese. Australian band Magic Dirt's 2000 song "Teenage Vampire" is a reference to the film's title.

Publishing
In Stephen King's 1986 novel It and its made-for-TV film adaptation, several of the characters watch this movie. Afterwards, Pennywise (Tim Curry) takes the form of a real teenage werewolf to frighten them, particularly Richie (Seth Green). When the Losers Club first attacks Pennywise, it takes the form of the teenage werewolf. In 2002, Last Gasp (publisher) published I Was a Teenage Dominatrix, a memoir by Shawna Kenney. In 2015, the anthology Killer Bees from Outer Space (KnightWatch Press) featured a story, "I Was a Teenage Mummy Girl", by Amelia Mangan.

References 
Notes

Bibliography

External links 

 
 

1957 horror films
1950s teen films
1957 films
American International Pictures films
American black-and-white films
Films directed by Gene Fowler Jr.
1950s monster movies
American teen horror films
American werewolf films
Films scored by Paul Dunlap
Teensploitation
Films about hypnosis
Films shot in Big Bear Lake, California
1950s English-language films
1950s American films